Cheng Chieh (April 3, 1993 - May 10, 2016) or Zheng Jie, was an executed Taiwanese murderer. In 2014, he committed an unprovoked murder case on the Taipei MRT train, causing 4 deaths and 24 injuries. The Supreme Court of the Republic of China sentenced him to 4 death sentences for homicide and an additional 144 years and 6 months in prison.

Early life
Cheng Chieh studied at the Mandarin Experimental Primary School and Hongdao National Middle School in Taipei City. His family was financially well-off, and his parents used imported luxury cars for transportation. When he was a teenager, Cheng Chieh had studied Taekwondo for four years and obtained the second-rank black belt qualification. Cheng Chieh's taekwondo coach interviewed said that when he was young, he was thin and behaved like other children. After class, he would stay to play with his younger brother and wait for his parents' car to pick him up. The professor commented that Cheng Chieh was just an ordinary child, happy and fond of it. Play and have a sense of honor, because of problems in family education, parents neglect their children to make changes.

The media reported that when Cheng Chieh was studying in middle school, he had a good interpersonal relationship and served as a squad leader and class representative. From middle school to university, every time his friends met with Cheng Chieh, Zheng Jie would tell about his murder plan and chat through games. Some people in the room also said that Cheng Chieh often mentioned that he wanted to go to the MRT to kill, but he did not expect it to come true.

After that, Cheng Chieh was admitted to the New Taipei City Banqiao Senior High School, and in September 2008, when he was a freshman in high school, he started a personal blog and wrote a blog on the website "Anonymous Station". He only provided the password of the blog. Log in to read for the students you recognize. New Taipei City Banqiao Senior High School interviewed and commented that Cheng Chieh was an alumnus of Class 17 of the 65th class in 2011. He had a normal performance in school, had a lively personality, liked to be funny, and could also cooperate with the basketball team, choir and other activities in the class. Any record of punishment or counseling was rewarded for his conscientious cleaning and excellent writing of weekly diaries. When Cheng Chieh's high school female tutor surnamed Chen received the news of her crime, she expressed that she was quite surprised and saddened and could not believe that her student had become a murderer.

Cheng Chieh's high school classmates said that when Cheng Chieh was in high school, his grades were at the top of the class, and he usually interacted with his classmates to be funny and popular; There are more than a dozen articles, mostly about hundreds of people being killed in confined spaces such as abandoned classrooms or stations. In addition, the media reported that Cheng Chieh wrote the message "I didn't set fire to my house" in the graduation album before graduation.

College life
After graduating from high school, Cheng Chieh enrolled in the Department of Power and Systems Engineering of the National Defense University Institute of Technology; until June 2013, in the second semester of his sophomore year, he was punished by the school for failing to obtain more than half of the credits in that semester. Dropped out, and in September of the same year, he entered the second year of the Department of Environmental Engineering at Tunghai University, Taichung, through the transfer exam. During the school's winter vacation in 2014, Cheng Chieh once again applied for the transfer exam to another school. He wanted to transfer to the Chinese literature department, which he was more interested in, but failed to pass the exam.

Regarding the experience during this period, Cheng Chieh's parents once told the police that they believed that Cheng Chieh had a lively personality when he was in high school, and his personality changed after he was dropped out of the National Defense University. A colleague of Zheng Jie's father said that Cheng Chieh's father studied engineering and worked in the family business of his relatives. Therefore, he planned to study science and engineering as the eldest son. Cheng Chieh was interested in writing and language since he was a child, and was admitted to the National Defense University. Later, he was dropped out of school due to lack of interest. The father's colleague also stated that he had also heard that Cheng Chieh planned to transfer to another school's Chinese department or foreign language department, but was opposed by his family. In the engineering department, because he was not interested in science and engineering and felt unhappy, he became addicted to the Internet or wrote fantasy novels, which became his way of gaining a sense of existence in real life.

When Cheng Chieh was studying at Tunghai University, he stayed at home most of the time. He didn't have a girlfriend. He didn't have many activities at ordinary times. Apart from going to school, he seldom communicated with friends. His monthly mobile phone calls were only about NT$300. Yuan, the only hobby is playing video games. Cheng Chieh’s parents told the media that Cheng Chieh likes to play murder and fighting games, and when he was interrogated by the police, he said that the games he likes to play are “League of Legends” and “Tower of Gods and Demons”, both of which Non-kill fighting type video games; the Taiwan agent of the game "League of Legends" issued a statement saying that its own game has nothing to do with Cheng Chieh's motive for the murder, and the company of "Tower of Gods and Demons" also stated that the product is a bead game, which has nothing to do with the case committed by Cheng Chieh.

Crime

On May 22, 2014, a roommate named Wang, who lived in the same dormitory with Cheng Chieh for nine months, said during an interview with the school: at 13:00 on May 21, he and another roommate had called Cheng Chieh on their mobile phones. Jie invited him to dinner, and Cheng Chieh responded briefly, "I'm in downtown Taichung, so I can't eat together", and ended the call; the student surnamed Wang called Cheng Chieh's cell phone again at 16:00 on the same day, but the cell phone was not connected, which was the time of Cheng Chieh's crime. . The student surnamed Wang said that he gets along with Cheng Chieh every day and thinks that he is a person with a good temper. Since he has never seen Cheng Chieh get angry and angry, he is surprised that Cheng Chieh committed the case.

Tunghai University, where Cheng Chieh was studying, issued a statement after the incident, stating: "No matter what, Cheng Chieh will always be our family. It's because we don't love him enough."

Aftermath
After Cheng Chieh committed the crime, the Taiwan New Taipei District Court sentenced him to four death sentences. The court's first-instance verdict mentioned that Zheng Jie once wrote the beginning and end of his oath to kill in an autobiography on the website "Anonymous Station". Cheng Chieh said in his blog "The Source" that he is "the big brother of the boys". He beats the girls every day in the middle school and is "very good", and there are two female classmates in the class that he cannot provoke, so he swears that he When he grows up, he will kill them; when he grows up, Cheng Chieh thinks that he has made his childhood oath "since he has made it, he must keep his word to himself", and vows that if he does not kill the two female classmates, he will encounter two consequences, one of which is " At the age of 43, he disappeared from the world", and the other "carried out a massacre" in order to find the whereabouts of the two girls. After that, the content of Cheng Chieh's blog began to revolve around the murder plot he conceived: in his article "Taipei Night Kill", he described his fantasy murder scene, including "two feet kicked the platform and the MRT headshot the track into a pool of blood." ; In "Hate", he wrote "If I catch you, I will not be a human being, and I will give you strong acid and alkali every day." When Cheng Chieh was dropped out of National Defense University and transferred to Tunghai University, his studies were unsatisfactory and he was reported.

Before Cheng Chieh was sentenced to death, he expressed the hope that someone would bring cartoons to the Taipei Detention Center where he was detained to visit, and Cheng Chieh's parents would send him pocket money from time to time, and they also asked relatives to help send salted crispy chicken, plantains, etc. to Cheng Chieh. His favorite food and the comic "One Piece", and bought a handheld TV so that Cheng Chieh could watch animations and news to pass the time; when Cheng Chieh said that "the water in jail is not good," his parents would also buy bottled water and send it to him. He tries his best to meet his needs. Other inmates and staff at the facility jokingly said that Cheng Chieh seemed to be in a summer camp.

Execution
At 20:47 on May 10, 2016, Cheng Chieh was executed at the Taipei Execution Ground of Taipei Prison (located in the Tucheng Detention Center). Before the execution, he only asked to drink water, and his family did not come forward before the execution. The delegation stated that it did not notify the family members and appointed lawyers before the execution, nor did it apply for an extraordinary appeal and retrial, and confirmed the death at 21:11. After the execution, the body was taken away by the family and was not sent to the Banqiao Funeral Home as usual. The body was cremated at 15:00 on May 13, 2016 at the Yusheng Hall of the Funeral Service Center in Zhongli District, Taoyuan City.

References

1993 births
2016 deaths
Executed Taiwanese people
People executed by Taiwan by firearm
People executed for murder
21st-century executions
Taiwanese people convicted of murder
People convicted of murder by Taiwan
People from New Taipei
National Defense University (Republic of China) alumni